The 1994–95 Winnipeg Jets season was the team's 23rd season in Winnipeg and their 16th season in the National Hockey League. Despite missing the playoffs for the second year in a row, the Jets featured the second-best forward line in the NHL that season, as Keith Tkachuk, Teemu Selanne and Alexei Zhamnov scored a collective 74 goals in 48 games. This total was second only to the Philadelphia Flyers' top-line total of 80 (scored collectively by the "Legion of Doom").

Offseason

Regular season
Two major highlights of the regular season occurred in April. On April 1, 1995, Alexei Zhamnov scored five goals in the Jets' 7–7 tie with Los Angeles Kings. Six days later, the Jets established a modern-day record by scoring four short-handed goals in a 7–4 win against the Vancouver Canucks.

Season standings

Schedule and results

Player statistics

Regular season
Scoring

Goaltending

Transactions

Trades

Waivers

Free agents

Draft picks

References
 Jets on Hockey Database

Winnipeg Jets (1972–1996) seasons
Winnipeg Jets season, 1994-95
Winn